The 2014 Erondegemse Pijl (Erpe-Mere) was a one-day women's cycle race held in Belgium, from Erpe to Erondegem. on August 2 2014. The tour has an UCI rating of 1.2.

Results

References

2014 in Belgian sport
2014 in women's road cycling
Erondegemse Pijl